Pushkin High School is a comprehensive high school in the city of Berezniki in Perm Krai oblast, Russia. Former Russian president Boris Yeltsin was educated there. 
There is also a high school by the same name in the city of Syktyvkar in Komi, Russia.

References

Education in Perm, Russia
Schools in Russia
Buildings and structures in Perm Krai